Dornbach (in its upper course: Kaltes Wasser) is a river of Hesse, Germany. It flows into the Eschbach in Bad Homburg vor der Höhe.

See also
List of rivers of Hesse

References

Rivers of Hesse
Rivers of the Taunus
Rivers of Germany